Djiru may refer to:
 Djiru people, an ethnic group of Australia
 Djiru language, a dialect of the Dyirbal language of Australia
 Djiru, Queensland, a locality in Australia

See also 
 Jiru (disambiguation)